RMS Empress of Britain was a transatlantic ocean liner built by Fairfield Shipbuilding at Govan on the Clyde in Scotland in 1955-1956  for Canadian Pacific Steamships (CP). This ship — the third of three CP vessels to be named Empress of Britain — regularly traversed the trans-Atlantic route between Canada and Europe until 1964, completing 123 voyages under the Canadian Pacific flag.

History

Empress of Britain
Empress of Britain was built by Fairfield Shipbuilding in Govan near Glasgow, Scotland.  She was launched on 22 June 1955 by HM Queen Elizabeth II.  This was nearly fifty years after the first CP Empress of Britain was launched from Govan in November 1905.  Eleven months later, she set out on a maiden voyage from Liverpool to Montreal, leaving Liverpool on 20 April 1956.

The 25,516-ton vessel had a length of 640 feet, and her beam was 85.2 feet. The ship had one funnel, one mast, twin propellers and an average speed of 20 knots.  The ocean liner provided accommodation for 160 first class passengers and for 984 tourist class passengers.

Queen Anna Maria
In November 1964, the former CP Empress was sold to the Greek Line; and the ship was renamed SS Queen Anna Maria.  This Queen was rebuilt with a new lido area at the stern and remeasured under Greek rules to 21,716 gross tons, implying a significant reduction in size. In fact her genuine tonnage had been increased by superstructure extension at the stern and the measurement was an attempt to reduce dock dues. With accommodation for 168 first-class passengers and for 1,145 tourist-class passengers, she sailed on the Piraeus to Naples to New York City route.  Later, she provided service on the Haifa to New York route. In due course, these liner services were replaced by full time, one class, cruising. In 1975, she was laid up at Piraeus for a time.

Carnivale

In 1976, the former Greek Queen was sold to Carnival Cruise Lines; and the ship was renamed — this time as the SS Carnivale.  As Carnival's market expanded and the company could afford to buy new ships, the ship transferred into a Latin market subsidiary cruise line.

Fiesta Marina
In 1993, Carnival Cruise Lines transferred registration of the Carnivale to a subsidiary cruise line, Fiesta Marina Cruises; and the ship was renamed SS Fiesta Marina.  She became something of a test ship in a cruise line expansion venture which proved ultimately to be unsuccessful.

Olympic
In 1994, Fiesta Marine sold ex-FiestaMarina to Epirotiki; and the ship was renamed Olympic. In 1996, she was transferred to Royal Olympic Cruises, operating under the same name.

The Topaz
In 1997, the  former Olympic was sold to Cyprus-based Thomson Holidays; and the ship was renamed The Topaz.

In 2003, the vessel was chartered, and then later sold to Topaz International to sail for Peace Boat operating under the name Peace Boat – she was repainted white with a blue funnel and her name painted in large letters across both sides of the hull. In October 2005, The Topaz was inspected and found to be in immaculate condition, the steam turbines engines operating flawlessly. Topaz International were looking for a buyer for The Topaz and they had maintained the ship in excellent condition. It was hoped that a buyer could be found as The Topaz offered any potential buyer the opportunity of a ready to work ship. However, rising oil prices combined with inefficient 50-year-old engines proved too much for any potential buyer. In April 2008, The Topaz was retired from the Peace Boat organization.

After retirement
After Topaz was retired in April 2008, she was laid up. On 15 June, while she was anchored, she was struck by the tanker Champion Brali. The collision severed off part of her bow. During her lay up, she was sold to the breakers. In the late summer of 2008, Topaz was beached in Alang, India to be scrapped. She was placed not too far away from where the remains of the /SS Norway were located. The ship began demolition a few months after being beached. As of December 2022, the Topaz has been completely scrapped.

See also
 Ships built at Govan

Notes

References
 Musk, George. (1981).  Canadian Pacific: The Story of the Famous Shipping Line.  Newton Abbot, Devon: David & Charles.

External links 
 Shipping Times: Clydebuilt Database

 

Ships built on the River Clyde
Ships of CP Ships
Ships of Carnival Cruise Line
1955 ships
Ocean liners of Canada